Westhampton is a hamlet and census-designated place (CDP) in Suffolk County, New York, United States. The population was 3,079 at the 2010 census.

Westhampton is in the Town of Southampton.

Geography
Westhampton is located at  (40.822894, -72.664306).

Climate
Westhampton has an oceanic climate (Cfb) under the Köppen climate classification, with moderately cold winters and warm summers. The plant hardiness is more similar to a humid continental climate (Dfb) although winter days are mild enough that Westhampton is unlikely to maintain long-term snow cover in a normal winter. Due to the lack of an urban environment and being away from the immediate coastline, the area has a lot colder nights than New York City. Westhampton sees an average of 43.4 inches of precipitation per year.

Demographics

Demographics of the CDP
As of the census of 2000, there were 2,869 people, 1,070 households, and 766 families residing in the CDP. The population density was 326.2 per square mile (125.9/km2). There were 1,601 housing units at an average density of 182.0/sq mi (70.2/km2). The racial makeup of the CDP was 91.04% White, 4.43% African American, 0.28% Native American, 1.25% Asian, 0.80% from other races, and 2.20% from two or more races. Hispanic or Latino of any race were 5.47% of the population.

There were 1,070 households, out of which 37.9% had children under the age of 18 living with them, 58.7% were married couples living together, 8.9% had a female householder with no husband present, and 28.4% were non-families. 23.0% of all households were made up of individuals, and 7.6% had someone living alone who was 65 years of age or older. The average household size was 2.66 and the average family size was 3.14.

In the CDP, the population was spread out, with 26.6% under the age of 18, 7.1% from 18 to 24, 30.3% from 25 to 44, 25.5% from 45 to 64, and 10.6% who were 65 years of age or older. The median age was 37 years.  For every 100 females, there are 100.3 males. For every 100 females age 18 and over, there were 97.1 males.

The median income for a household in the CDP was $67,125, and the median income for a family was $80,313. Men had a median income of $51,331 versus $36,875 for women. The per capita income for the CDP was $31,894. About 3.4% of families and 4.5% of the population were below the poverty line, including 3.7% of those under age 18 and 9.0% of those age 65 or over.

Notable person
Howard Cosell, 20th century television sports journalist.

References

Southampton (town), New York
Census-designated places in New York (state)
Hamlets in New York (state)
Census-designated places in Suffolk County, New York
Hamlets in Suffolk County, New York
Populated coastal places in New York (state)